Sadhbh Uí Mhailchonaire, Ban Ollamh Síol Muireadaigh, 1441-1447.

The Annals of Connacht, sub anno 1447, record her death as follows:Sadb daughter of Uilliam Mac Branain, wife of Mailin O Mailchonaire, died after a victory over the world and the Devil. However, a more fulsome account appears in Mac Fhirbhisigh's annals, where she is called Banollamh of Silmiredhy fitz ffeargus and a nurse to all guests and strangers and of all the learned men in Ireland.

Her husband, the poet and historian Mailin mac Tanaide Ó Maolconaire died in 1441, after which Sadhbh apparently replaced him as poet, hence the term banollamh (woman-poet).

External links
 http://www.ucc.ie/celt/published/T100011/index.html

Sources
 Annals of Connacht, A. Martin Freeman, Dublin, 1946.
 Annals of Ireland from the year 1443 ... translated by ... Dudley mac Firbisse, ed. John O'Donovan, in The Miscellany of the Irish Archaeological Society, vol. i, pp. 198–302, Dublin, 1846.

14th-century births
1447 deaths
15th-century Irish historians
Irish women poets
People from County Roscommon
15th-century Irish poets
Medieval Irish nobility
14th-century Irish women
15th-century Irish women
Irish-language writers
Women historians